Euxoa sibirica, the Siberian cutworm, is a moth of the family Noctuidae. It is found from western Siberia to the Amur region. It is also found on the Kuriles and in Sakhalin, Mongolia, western China, Tibet, Afghanistan, Nepal, India, the Korean Peninsula and Japan.

The length of the forewings is about 19 mm. Adults are on wing from early summer. They are dormant for some time to reappear in autumn. It is thought the species migrates from lowland reproduction grounds to alpine aestivation sites. There is one generation per year.

It is an occasional pest on crops, including crucifers, beets, corn and beans.

External links
Colour Atlas of the Siberian Lepidoptera
Preliminary Notes On The Aestivation Of A Cutworm Moth, Euxoa Sibirica Boisduval, At High Altitudes In Tohoku District (Lepidoptera : Noctuidae)
Overwintering of Eggs in the Siberian Cutworm

Euxoa
Moths of Japan
Moths described in 1837